Wolf Creek is a stream in St. Charles and Warren Counties in the U.S. state of Missouri. It is a tributary of Tuque Creek.

Wolf Creek has the name of Gus Wolf, the original owner of the site.

See also
List of rivers of Missouri

References

Rivers of St. Charles County, Missouri
Rivers of Warren County, Missouri
Rivers of Missouri